Aspen Park is a park in Washington County, Utah, southwest of Enterprise and the Enterprise Reservoir, and northwest of St. George, in the Bull Valley Mountains.

The park has many groves of quaking aspens, maple, juniper, Pinyon pine, and oak. It has multiple campgrounds near the reservoir, picnic spots, and fishing ponds. Aspen Park also has a 5-mile trail to nearby Pine Park; the trail features Ponderosa pines and the Beaver Dam Wash. 

Parks in Utah